The Apple Icon Image format is an icon format used in Apple Inc.'s macOS. It supports icons of 16 × 16, 32 × 32, 48 × 48, 128 × 128, 256 × 256, 512 × 512 points at 1x and 2x scale, with both 1- and 8-bit alpha channels and multiple image states (example: open and closed folders). The fixed-size icons can be scaled by the operating system and displayed at any intermediate size.

As of macOS 11, asset catalogs are the preferred file format for macOS custom icons instead.

File structure 
The file format consists of an 8 byte header, followed by any number of icons.

Header

Icon data

Icon types 

  The value inside the parenthesis is the uncompressed length for ARGB and 24-bit RGB icons.
   data always starts with a header of four zero-bytes (tested all icns files in macOS 10.15.7 and macOS 11). Usage unknown, the four zero-bytes can be any value and are quietly ignored.
  These formats are supported in standalone icns files but do not display properly if used as application icon inside a  package.

Image data format 
 Mono icons with alpha mask can display three colors: white, black, and transparent.
 The 4-bit an 8-bit icons use a fixed color palette with 16 colors and 256 colors respectively.
 The 24-bit RGB format consists of the three compressed channels tightly packed (see Compression). The  icon must start with a four-byte header, see footnote above.
 The ARGB format consists of the ascii values for 'ARGB' and the four compressed channels tightly packed (see Compression).

Compatibility 
 the ARGB fields also accept files in PNG format – but not vice versa, you can not put ARGB images in any of the PNG-only fields (tested on macOS 11).
 ARGB images are only supported in macOS 11 and newer – macOS 10.15.7 does not display ARGB images. Yet, even the ARGB keys can be displayed on macOS 10.15 if you set a JPEG 2000 or PNG image (see footnote on usage in app packages above).
 The 24-bit RGB icons also allow images in JPEG 2000 and PNG format (tested on macOS 10.15.7 and macOS 11).
 The support for newer image types seems to be introduced later than the key field (see previous two points). Therefore, the supported OS version may not be accurate or adjusted based on file format.

Other types 

 The table of contents is a list of all contained types (4 byte type-name + 4 byte length).
 The data for all nested icns files does not contain the icns file-header. So, if you want to save the data to a file you have to prepend the icns header.

Compression 

Over time the format has been improved and there is support for compression of some parts of the pixel data. The 24-bit RGB and ARGB pixel data are compressed (per channel) with a format similar to PackBits.
Some sources mention that the OS supports both compressed or uncompressed data chunks. However, manually crafting icns files with uncompressed 24-bit RGB or ARGB images will not display properly – at least on newer macOS releases (tested on macOS 11).

The following pseudocode decompresses the data:
While there's compressed data:
    Read one byte as an unsigned number N
    If N < 0x80:
        Output the next (N + 1) bytes
    Else:
        Output the next byte (N - 0x80 + 3) times
Example:  should decompress to

Known issues 

As of macOS 11, there are certain issues / bugs with the file format:

 Setting  or  will display a proper icon. But setting  ignores the transparency mask and displays an icon without transparency.
 Compressed ARGB data is not interpreted correctly. The last value of the blue channel (aka. the very last value) is ignored and treated as if it were all zero-bytes. Usually this is no issue since most icons will have transparency at the bottom right corner anyway. However, it can become an issue if the last value is a repeating byte (see Compression). Potentially, up to 130 pixels can lack the blue channel value.  A workaround is to append an additional byte at the end which is interpreted as a control character without following data. You can compare the difference with these two examples:
  
 
The keys work fine in a standalone icns file but if used in an application, the icons are displayed completely scrambled. If using ARGB image data, make sure to provide alternative formats for macOS 10.15 and earlier. This issue is especially tricky to detect if you provide both, 16x16 and 16x16@2x icons, because if you connect your Mac to a non-retina monitor, the non-retina 16x16 icon will be used and thus the icon will be displayed scrambled. The  field does not seem to be used in application icons and can safely be ignored. Additionally, if you don't provide the smaller icon sizes at all the bug will also manifest when the OS scales down your larger PNG/JPEG 2000 icons, so make sure to render smaller sizes and include them.

Support 
Various image viewers  can load *.icns files, and free and open source converters from or to PNG also exist. GTK+ can load *.icns resources since 2007. Other tools supporting the format include the Apple Icon Composer and icns Browser, The Iconfactory, and IconBuilder.
MacOS offers the built-in iconutil command line tool to pack and unpack *.icns files.

See also
 ICO format on Windows
 X PixMap format for X11

References

External links
 IconFamily (last update 2013) – Open source Objective C class to read and write Apple icns files
 osxiconutils (not maintained) – Command line tools to work with Apple icns files
 icnsutil – Python library to read and write icns files
 icns - Rust crate to read and write icns files

Graphics file formats
MacOS
Computer icons